Stenchaetothrips biformis is a species of thrips. It is a pest of sorghum in India.

References

Thripidae
Insect pests of millets